Brodiaea appendiculata, the appendage brodiaea or appendage cluster-lily,) is an uncommon species of plant in the genus Brodiaea.

Brodiaea appendiculata is endemic to California, where it grows in the mountain foothills in the north part of the state.

References

External links
  Calflora Database: Brodiaea appendiculata (Hoover's brodiaea, Hoover Appendage brodiaea)
Jepson Manual eFlora (TJM2) treatment of Brodiaea appendiculata
USDA Plants Profile for Brodiaea appendiculata (appendage brodiaea)
Brodiaea appendiculata — U.C. Photos gallery

appendiculata
Endemic flora of California
Flora of the Sierra Nevada (United States)
Natural history of the California chaparral and woodlands
Natural history of the Central Valley (California)
Natural history of the San Francisco Bay Area